Bohuslav Raion was a raion (district) in Kyiv Oblast of Ukraine. Its administrative center was the city of Bohuslav. The raion was abolished on 18 July 2020 as part of the administrative reform of Ukraine, which reduced the number of raions of Kyiv Oblast to seven. The area of Bohuslav Raion was split between Bila Tserkva and Obukhiv Raions.

Subdivisions
At the time of disestablishment, the raion consisted of two hromadas, 
 Bohuslav urban hromada with the administration in the city of Bohuslav, transferred to Obukhiv Raion;
 Medvyn rural hromada with the administration in the selo of Medvyn, transferred to Bila Tserkva Raion.

Bohuslav raion consisted of 1 city (Bohuslav), and 40 villages. The villages of Bohuslav raion included:

References

Former raions of Kyiv Oblast
1923 establishments in Ukraine
Ukrainian raions abolished during the 2020 administrative reform